Black darter is a common name for several animals and may refer to:

Etheostoma duryi, a fish
Sympetrum danae, a dragonfly

Animal common name disambiguation pages